Cop Shoot Cop was a noise rock group founded in New York City in 1987. They disbanded in 1996. The band were frequently classified as industrial rock, but were often quite different from many bands so dubbed: having a distinctive instrumental lineup that encompassed twin bass guitars, found metal percussion, and no lead guitar. The group had little mainstream success (scoring a few hits on college radio), despite tours with Iggy Pop and music videos on MTV's Headbangers Ball and 120 Minutes (notably for "$10 Bill", featuring a number of little people). They retain a cult following—their out-of-print releases sometimes sell for large amounts.

History
Initially, the group was a trio of Tod A. (vocals, bass guitar), David Ouimet (keyboards, sampler) and Phil Puleo on drums and "metal" (he incorporated various found objects into his drum set). (Tod and Puleo had earlier played in a short-lived Providence, Rhode Island group, Dig Dat Hole, with guitarist John Rose.) The A./Puleo/Ouimet lineup was captured on the "Headkick Facsimile" 12" EP, which was released in a small pressing by the Japanese record label Supernatural Organization in 1989 (later reissued by the group's own Subvert Entertainment in 1994 with the addition of the song "Robert Tilton Handjob" from the "Piece Man" 7"). Wharton Tiers engineered the EP.

Puleo reports their name was inspired by both the band members' shared dislike of police officers, and a newspaper headline about a botched police raid, reading "'Cop Shot Cop" or "Cop Shoots Cop". This is also the perpetual cycle of a heroin addict: Cop (acquire heroin), Shoot (consume heroin), Cop (acquire more heroin), etc.

The trio placed a number of posters stating only "CopShootCop" around New York, which helped generate discussion and interest; some observers reportedly thought the posters were a political protest against police brutality.

Their first performance was with Half Japanese.

The trio added Jack Natz (formerly bassist in early New York hardcore band The Undead) on bass guitar and Tod briefly sang without playing bass. They missed Tod's distinctive "high end" bass playing, however, and they realized only popular convention required a single bass player in a rock band, and both Tod and Natz decided to play the instrument with the group. The relative novelty of a dual-bass, no-guitar rock group certainly helped gather attention. Natz sang occasionally, and various members wrote songs, but Tod remained the group's primary singer and songwriter.

Ouimet rejoined and left the group several times; Jim Coleman was recruited to replace him on sampler, and both men were in the group for their debut recording, the "Piece Man" 7" in 1989. The single's cover was spattered with real pig's blood, gaining them some notoriety in record collecting circles. Their first full-length album, Consumer Revolt, recorded by notable producer Martin Bisi, is probably the only dual-bass, dual-sampler, no-guitar album in rock music's history. The band quickly earned a reputation as one of the best live bands in NYC, as well as for prolific band graffiti.

After the first album and tour, Ouimet left for good: he founded the short-lived Motherhead Bug and would later guest with Cop Shoot Cop, playing trombone or leading the "Motherhead Horns" horn section.

Cop Shoot Cop continued recording and touring; they surprised some fans by recruiting guitarist Steve McMillen for Release, released by Interscope Records. Ned Raggett argues that McMillen's appearance "Given how Cop Shoot Cop had evolved its own unique sound out of the basses, drums, and samplers from the original members, becoming more of a straight-ahead rock group inevitably made the band a little less special." (Still, he offers a largely positive review). A different review notes that "Tod A. is the Andrew Vachss of underground rock, telling stories of pathetic losers and maniac outsiders who believe they are the sane ones", while Black and Sprague note that Release finds Cop Shoot Cop "sneaking surreptitiously toward the mainstream".

The band dissolved a year or so after Release. Tod claimed the group had been treated poorly by Interscope, and refused to allow the company to issue their final album. The other band members disagreed, noting the album was very nearly complete, and that they had all worked on the $150,000 recording sessions. The remaining members of Cop Shoot Cop attempted to complete the album, but Interscope declined to release the material. It eventually found an outlet in the album Red Expendables.

Post-Cop Shoot Cop
Tod A formed Firewater, who have released seven albums. Coleman has recorded as "Phylr" and "Here" (with Teho Teardo), Puleo played with both Congo Norvell and Swans as well composing for film, and Jack Natz most recently teamed up with Stu Spasm to handle bass duties for a reformed Lubricated Goat. Coleman and Puleo have worked together on a project called Audio Dyslexia. More recently, Coleman and Puleo have collaborated with film and theater actor and writer Michael Wiener on a project called "The Children...", releasing a self-titled CD and performing a number of show-events typically integrating projections and theatrical elements, and occurring in nontraditional venues such as multimedia dinner theaters and churches.

On their 1997 album City, Strapping Young Lad covered "Room 429" (originally from Cop Shoot Cop's Ask Questions Later.) In the same year, space rock band Spiritualized included a track titled "Cop Shoot Cop" on their album Ladies and Gentlemen We Are Floating in Space.

In 2005, Cop Shoot Cop's "Migration" (Puleo) was used in a television ad for Nike.

A later addition to the group, Michael Kaminski joined as lead guitarist, touring in Europe until the band's 1996 breakup. He continued to play music in Europe, eventually returning to his hometown of Akron, Ohio. An arrest there landed him in the news and in the headlines of music blogs.

In late 2019, Phil Puleo and Jim Coleman joined Chris Spencer (from the now disbanded UNSANE) and Chris Pravdica (former Puleo bandmate from Swans) to form the industrial/rock/noise supergroup Human Impact. Their first self-titled album was released in March 2020.

Members
Tod A. – vocals, bass guitar (1987–1996)
Jim Coleman – sampler, piano (1988–1996)
Steven McMillen – guitar, trumpet (1993–1996)
Jack Natz – bass guitar, vocals, harmonica (1988–1996)
Phil Puleo – drums, percussion (1987–1996)
David Ouimet – keyboards, sampler (1987–1989)

Discography

Studio albums

Splits and EPs

Singles

Compilation appearances

References

External links
Phil Puleo's website
Phil Puleo's Instagram
Cop Shoot Cop
Jim Coleman's website
Jack Nantz's Instagram

Musical groups from New York (state)
American experimental rock groups